The 2002 Wake Forest Demon Deacons football team was an American football team that represented Wake Forest University during the 2002 NCAA Division I-A football season. In their second season under head coach Jim Grobe, the Demon Deacons compiled a 7–6 record and finished in a tie for seventh place in the Atlantic Coast Conference.

Schedule

Team leaders

References

Wake Forest
Wake Forest Demon Deacons football seasons
Seattle Bowl champion seasons
Wake Forest Demon Deacons football